Joaquin Pastore (born 5 December 1981 in Montevideo) is a Uruguayan rugby union player. He plays as a wing or as a centre.

His current team is Old Boys.

Pastore holds 37 caps for Uruguay, with 4 tries scored, 20 points in aggregate, since his debut, at 27 April 2003, in a 20-13 win over Chile, for the South American Rugby Championship, Division 1. Uruguay qualified the same year for the second time to be present at the 2003 Rugby World Cup finals. They managed a win over Georgia by 24-12. Pastore played in all the four games, one of them as a substitute, remaining scoreless.

He has been a regular presence at The Teros side, being present at the unsuccessful attempt at qualification for the 2007 Rugby World Cup finals, lost in the repechage to Portugal.

Pastore played in the double wins over Brazil (71-3) and Chile (43-9) for the 2011 Rugby World Cup qualifyings. Uruguay lost both home and away matches to USA but defeated Kazakhstan and qualified for the final play-offs with Romania, being eliminated.

External links
Joaquin Pastore International Statistics

1981 births
Living people
Rugby union players from Montevideo
Uruguayan rugby union players
Rugby union wings
Rugby union centres
Uruguayan people of Italian descent
Uruguay international rugby union players
People educated at The British Schools of Montevideo